Päri, or Lokoro, is a Luo language of South Sudan. Päri has been claimed to have ergative alignment, which is rare-to-nonexistent in African languages, although recent descriptions of the language have instead described the case system as marked nominative (nominative–absolutive).

References 

Luo languages